The 1973–74 Rugby Union County Championship was the 74th edition of England's County Championship rugby union club competition.

Gloucestershire won their 11th title after defeating Lancashire in the final.

Semi finals

Final

See also
 English rugby union system
 Rugby union in England

References

Rugby Union County Championship
County Championship (rugby union) seasons